A hypocorism (  or  ; from Ancient Greek: , from , 'to call by pet names', sometimes also hypocoristic) or pet name is a name used to show affection for a person.  It may be a diminutive form of a person's name, such as Izzy for Isabel or Bob for Robert, or it may be unrelated.

In linguistics, the term can be used more specifically to refer to the morphological process by which the standard form of the word is transformed into a form denoting affection, or to words resulting from this process. In English, a word is often clipped down to a closed monosyllable and then suffixed with -y/-ie (phonologically /i/). Sometimes the suffix -o is included as well as other forms or templates.

Hypocoristics are often affective in meaning and are particularly common in Australian English, but can be used for various purposes in different semantic fields, including personal names, place names and nouns. Hypocorisms are usually considered distinct from diminutives, but they can also overlap.

See also 
 Nickname
 Term of endearment

References 

 
Nicknames
Rhetorical techniques